The following is a list of mountains that have been presumed, at one time, to be the highest mountain in the world. How general the following presumptions were is unclear. Before the Age of Discovery, no geographer could make any plausible assumption.

 Chimborazo, . Presumed highest from sixteenth century until the beginning of  the 19th century. Not in the top 100 highest mountains when measured from sea level, however due to the Earth's equatorial bulge this is the farthest point from the Earth's center.
 Nanda Devi, . Presumed highest in the world in an era when Nepal was still closed to the outside world. Now known to be the 23rd highest mountain in the world.
 Dhaulagiri, . Presumed highest from 1808 until 1847. Now known to be the 7th highest mountain in the world.
 Kangchenjunga, . Presumed highest from 1847 until 1852. Now known to be the 3rd highest mountain in the world.
 K2, . Discovered in 1856 before Mount Everest's status was officially confirmed, K2's elevation became something of an enigma until it was officially resolved at a later date. However, this erroneous figure was quickly retracted, and K2's status as second highest was reaffirmed.
 Mount Everest, . Established as highest in 1852 and officially confirmed in 1856.

See also
World altitude record (mountaineering)

References

Presumed